Tanner Jeannot (born May 29, 1997) is a Canadian professional ice hockey forward for the  Tampa Bay Lightning of the National Hockey League (NHL). Jeannot is known as "The Oxbow Ox" in recognition of his physical play and his hometown of Oxbow, Saskatchewan.

Playing career
Jeannot played major junior hockey for the Moose Jaw Warriors in the Western Hockey League (WHL) and was signed by the Nashville Predators as an undrafted free agent to a three-year, entry-level contract on April 2, 2018.

In the 2020–21 season, Jeannot made his NHL debut appearing in a fourth-line role for the Predators in a 4–2 defeat against the Carolina Hurricanes on March 2, 2021. Despite pacing all rookies in goals (24) and hits (318) in the 2021–22 season, Jeannot was not nominated for the Calder Memorial Trophy. This marked the first time in NHL history an eligible player led his class in goals and was not nominated for the award.

In the 2022–23 season, Jeannot playing in the final season of his entry-level contract with the Predators, was unable to match his rookie season offensive pace in registering five goals and 14 points through 56 regular season games. With the Predators losing ground for playoff contention, Jeannot was traded by Nashville to the Tampa Bay Lightning in exchange for defenceman Cal Foote, along with a package of five draft picks, including a 2025 first-round pick (lottery protected) on February 26, 2023.

Career statistics

References

External links
 

1997 births
Living people
Chicago Wolves players
Florida Everblades players
Ice hockey people from Saskatchewan
Milwaukee Admirals players
Moose Jaw Warriors players
Nashville Predators players
Tampa Bay Lightning players
Undrafted National Hockey League players